Nevis Express was a charter airline which operated from St Kitts and Nevis, West Indies, based at Newcastle Airport on Nevis. The fleet consisted of three BN-2A aircraft seating nine passengers, and two Beech 1900C-1 aircraft seating 19 passengers.

References

Airlines established in 1993
1993 establishments in North America
Airlines disestablished in 2003
2003 disestablishments in North America